Vishera may refer to:

 Vishera FX-series CPU, codename for a line of CPU by AMD
 Vishera Nature Reserve, in Perm Krai, Russia
 Malaya Vishera, town in Novgorod Oblast, Russia
 Vishera River (disambiguation)

See also
 Viscera (disambiguation)